Alice Grace Cook  (18 February 1877 - 27 May 1958), known as Grace Cook or A. Grace Cook was a British astronomer. Cook lived in Stowmarket, Suffolk. After she died she was remembered by her colleagues as a skilled and dedicated observer. In September 2021 it was announced that a new school in the town was to be named after Grace Cook. The school will be run by the Orwell Multi Academy Trust.

Career

Grace Cook attended a series of lectures in astronomy given by Joseph Hardcastle in the autumn of 1909. Enthused she joined the British Astronomical Association on 22 February 1911 at the invitation of Hardcastle. Cook observed the 7 November 1914 transit of Mercury from her observatory. In January 1916 Cook was among the first group of women elected as Fellows of the Royal Astronomical Society. Her RAS election was proposed by W F Denning. With Joseph Alfred Hardcastle, Cook worked to identify and describe 785 New General Catalogue objects on the 206 plates of the John Franklin-Adams photographic survey. She was renowned for her work observing meteors, and also observed naked-eye phenomena including the zodiacal light and aurorae. During World War One Cook, with Fiammetta Wilson, temporarily headed the British Astronomical Association's Meteor Section. Cook observed comets and Milky Way novae and was among the first people to see V603 Aquilae, a nova discovered in June 1918. This work earned her the Edward C. Pickering Fellowship from the Maria Mitchell Association in 1920–1921. From 1921 to 1923 Cook was sole director of the British Astronomical Association's Meteor Section. On 30 May 1922 she attended the RAS Centenary celebrations held at Burlington House where she appears in the group photograph identified as number 16.

Publications

Further reading

References

Women astronomers
20th-century British astronomers
1870s births
1958 deaths
Fellows of the Royal Astronomical Society
20th-century British women scientists